Gunther W. Holtorf is a German world traveler who, often in company of his partner Christine, journeyed approximately  across the world in his G-Wagen Mercedes Benz named "Otto", visiting 215 countries in 26 years.

Travels 
Holtorf had a lengthy career with Lufthansa beginning in 1958, and eventually became an overseas representative; he was later a managing director at Hapag-Lloyd. He developed a love of travel while working in Argentina. In 1989, Holtorf left his job to take an on-the-road journey, beginning with the idea of spending 18 months discovering the African countryside in his 1988 G-Wagen. He was accompanied on this initial trip by his third wife Beate, and after their divorce embarked on another leg with companion Christine beginning in 1990. The couple subsequently traveled a few months out of most years, with a hiatus in 2000 and most of 2001, until picking up intensity in 2005 and beginning to travel almost non-stop throughout the year. After Christine developed cancer, her son Martin sometimes took her place as Holtorf's traveling companion, beginning in 2007. After her final trip in May 2009, Christine settled in Bavaria, where the couple wed several weeks before her death in June 2010. Holtorf resumed traveling with Martin or with Elke Dreweck until 2014.

For the first five years, Holtorf and his companion traveled through Africa, thereafter shipping the car to South America to continue their journeys there. Through subsequent years, they traveled upwards through Central America, the United States and Canada before traveling south again and shipping the car to Australia and Asia and through the Caribbean and into other regions of the world. By the end of the voyage, Holtorf had driven through 179 countries in 26 years. In some countries Otto was the first personal car permitted belonging to a foreigner, and Holtorf was the first Westerner to drive in North Korea.

Holtorf traveled inexpensively, avoiding hotels and sleeping in the car, from which the rear seats were removed, or in hammocks pitched near it, supporting his trips by map making. His map of Jakarta, begun before his voyages in 1977 but updated during them, is the first detailed map of the city. As of 2001, it was 385 pages long. Holtorf has also extensively photographed his voyage. His car is displayed in the Mercedes museum in Stuttgart.

Works
 1970 - Hong Kong - Welt Der Gegensätze published in English as Hong Kong - World of Contrasts (translator Donna Silberberg)
 1977 - Jakarta-Jabotabek Street Atlas and Names Index, first published as a folded map and subsequently expanded in many editions such as the 12th edition of 2001, which was a book of 385 pages.

See also
 List of travelers

References

External links 
Gunther, Christine and Otto, How a man met a woman and they set off on an epic journey across six continents in one amazing unbreakable car
German man drives Mercedes G-Wagen on 557k-mile, 26-year road trip
Gunther Holtorf completes 884,000km world tour in a Mercedes-Benz G-Wagen

Living people
People from Berlin
German travel writers
German male non-fiction writers
Travelers
Year of birth missing (living people)
21st-century cartographers
20th-century cartographers